Sar Gar or Sar-e Gar may refer to:
 Sar Gar, Fars
 Sar Gar, Sistan and Baluchestan